The Wired CD is an album that was released in 2004 as a collaborative effort between Wired magazine, Creative Commons, and sixteen musicians and groups. The Wired CD was distributed inside the front cover of the November 2004 issue of Wired, which also featured a variety of interviews and bios of the performers. Unusually, the songs were released under one of two Creative Commons Licenses, permitting sampling and file-sharing of the songs.

The WIRED CD was the first major compilation of music free to sample and share under Creative Commons' "some rights reserved" copyright. The groundbreaking album features tracks from the Beastie Boys, David Byrne, Zap Mama, My Morning Jacket, Spoon, Gilberto Gil, Dan the Automator, Thievery Corporation, Le Tigre, Paul Westerberg, Fine Arts Militia featuring Chuck D, The Rapture, Cornelius, Danger Mouse & Jemini, DJ Dolores, and Matmos.

In 2005, Creative Commons and Wired Magazine launched The Fine Art of Sampling Contest in which contestants sampled the tracks from The Wired CD to create their own composition. The top winning entries were subsequently compiled onto a CD entitled  The Wired CD: Ripped. Sampled. Mashed. Shared.

Licenses
All but three songs are released under the Sampling Plus license:

People can take and transform pieces of [the]  work for any purpose other than advertising, which is prohibited. Noncommercial copying and distribution (like file-sharing) of the entire work are also allowed. Hence, "plus".

The songs by the Beastie Boys (track 1), My Morning Jacket (track 4), and Chuck D with Fine Arts Militia (track 11) are released under the Noncommercial Sampling Plus license:

People can take and transform pieces of [the]  work for noncommercial purposes only. Noncommercial copying and distribution (like file-sharing) of the entire work are also allowed.

Songs
 Beastie Boys, "Now Get Busy"
 David Byrne, "My Fair Lady"
 Zap Mama, "Wadidyusay?"
 My Morning Jacket, "One Big Holiday"
 Spoon, "Revenge!"
 Gilberto Gil, "Oslodum"
 Dan the Automator, "Relaxation Spa Treatment"
 Thievery Corporation, "DC 3000"
 Le Tigre, "Fake French"
 Paul Westerberg, "Looking Up in Heaven"
 Chuck D with Fine Arts Militia, "No Meaning No"
 The Rapture, "Sister Saviour" (Blackstrobe Remix)
 Cornelius, "Wataridori 2"
 Danger Mouse & Jemini, "What U Sittin' On?" (starring Cee Lo and Tha Alkaholiks)
 DJ Dolores, "Oslodum 2004" (includes (cc) sample of "Oslodum" by Gilberto Gil)
 Matmos, "Action at a Distance"

The Freestyle Mix Contest
All is here.

Entrants in the Fine Art of Sampling Contests were challenged with sampling or mashing up the WIRED tracks to produce new works judged on their originality, incorporation of the sampled songs, and technical merit. The contests included two categories of competition, the winners of which appear below.

WIRED Magazine music editors and contributors chose eleven winners to appear on the forthcoming, Creative Commons-produced WIRED CD—Ripped. Sampled. Mashed. Shared. The winning tracks were:
"Bored on Your Backside" by Trifonic
"counterfeit funk (the open source conspiracy)" by jsn 
"My Fair Hiphop (Challenge Mix)" by VEGO featuring DJ AKA
"Dangerouse" by Ashwan 
"dislocation" by Sllid
"freemix-simplemix" by Cezary Ostrowski
"hiphop holiday (stoner rap mix)" by Short Faced Bear
"Gil's Zapture Loop" by megabuzz
"out of my way" by Prof. m.Stereo
"Revolve" by hisboyelroy
"Beatgorilla's 28 grams Remix" by Pat Chilla The Beat Gorilla

The Militia Mix Contest
All is here.

Brian Hardgroove (Fine Arts Militia) and Scott Egbert (GigAmerica) chose one winner of the Militia Mix Contest for inclusion on the next Fine Arts Militia album (featuring Chuck D), slated for a Spring 2005 release. The winner was "On Meaning On" by heavyconfetti.

See also
Share-alike

External links
 : Information on Free Music Archive
on ccMixter.org
"Sample the Future": Wired magazine article about the CD, as well as the philosophy behind it and the Creative Commons license
 on archive.org
https://mirrors.creativecommons.org/ccmixter/contrib/Wired/

Compilation albums included with magazines
Creative Commons-licensed albums
2004 compilation albums